Yttilä is a village in the municipality of Säkylä, in the Satakunta region of Finland.

Church
The village church stands to the north, with the churchyard containing a number of war graves dating back to the Second World War.

Cultural references 
The video game My Summer Car features a fictional village shop named Teimon Kauppa which bears a strong resemblance to former village store Sepon Kauppa (lit. Seppo's Shop; closed in 2014) located in Yttilä. Developer Johannes Rojola confirmed the shop was used as inspiration in 2017.

References 

Säkylä
Villages in Finland